Indira Gandhi Institute of Medical Sciences, an Institute under State Legislature Act (Government), was established on 19 November 1983 as an autonomous organisation on the pattern of All India Institute of Medical Sciences, New Delhi. It is one of the main health care institutions in the state of Bihar. It is the only superspecialist institute of Bihar and tops the hierarchy in patient referral chain. The institute provides education in medicine and does conducts many health and medicinal research in Bihar. It received affiliation of medical college from MCI in September 2011. It has 120 recognised MBBS seats and the highest number of superspeciality seats among the colleges of Bihar.

It is recognised to provide degree of MBBS, MD, MS, M.Ch, DM, DNB, Ph.D. and various paramedical degrees.

Campus
IGIMS is located in Bailey Road. The whole medical college and hospital campus is spread over an area of 131 acres. The hospital is proposed to have 2500 beds in the coming few years. At present, there are nearly 1070 beds present with a 100-bed Regional Cancer Institute. Construction is ongoing of another 500-bed ultra modern hospital, and 200-bed Regional Institute of Ophthalmology.

Departments

IGIMS provides the following clinical departments:
 Anaesthesia
 Endocrinology
 Cardiology
 Cardiothoracic and Vascular Surgery
 Community Medicine
 Dentistry
 Ear, Nose & Throat (ENT)
 Gastroenterology
 GI Surgery
 Internal Medicine
 Nephrology
 Neurosurgery
 Neurology
 Nuclear Medicine
 Orthopedics
 Paediatric
 Psychiatry
 Pulmonology
  Reproductive Biology
 Regional Cancer Center
 Regional Institute of Ophthalmology (RIO)
 Skin (Dermatology)
 Urology
 Trauma and Casualty 
 General Surgery
 Pediatric Surgery

References

External links 
 Official website of IGIMS

Institute under State Legislature Act
Medical and health sciences universities in India
Medical colleges in Bihar
Universities and colleges in Patna
Monuments and memorials to Indira Gandhi
Educational institutions established in 1983
1983 establishments in Bihar
Hospitals in Patna